Port Moresby Strikers, also known as Southern Strikers, are a professional football club founded in 2017 and based in Port Moresby, Papua New Guinea.

Their best domestic result to date came in the 2018 edition of the Papua New Guinea National Soccer League, when they finished 5th.

History 
The club was founded in 2017, shortly before the start of the 2017 National Soccer League season. The side were due to take part in the 2017 edition of the league alongside six other teams, but failed to show for their first match. In May 2017, it was reported that the side had deferred their application fee for the following season, and in doing so were the first side to confirm their interest ahead of the 2018 season.

By January 2018, their participation in the 2018 season was confirmed, alongside six other teams. However, their season didn't get off to the best of starts, losing their first three games, firstly to fellow debutants FC Momase, and then to more experienced sides Madang FC and Besta PNG United. Their first victory came in the fourth week of fixtures against Morobe Wawens, who they defeated 4–3 after having been two goals down. The side failed to win any more matches throughout the season, and were almost suspended from the league in May 2018 after they had failed to fully settle their affiliation fees, but the club eventually did so by 10 May and were subsequently awarded two default victories against Buang FC and FC Momase, who did fail to settle their fees. This meant the side finished 5th overall, and failed to qualify for the playoffs.

In December 2018, it was reported that the side would be returning for the 2019 season, and had been drawn into the Southern Conference. They picked up their first victory in the second round of fixtures, beating newcomers Star Mountain FC 2–1 thanks to a late goal by Renagi Taviri. This would be their only victory of the season, drawing three times and losing ten times to finish bottom of the Southern Conference.

Domestic record

National competitions 

 Papua New Guinea National Soccer League
2017: Withdrew
 2018: 5th
 2019: Southern Conference: 8th

References 

Football clubs in Papua New Guinea
Association football clubs established in 2017
2017 establishments in Papua New Guinea